Mr. Monk Goes to Hawaii is the second novel based on the Monk television series. It was written in 2006 by Lee Goldberg.

Plot synopsis
Natalie Teeger is invited to be the maid of honor at the wedding of her best friend Candace in Hawaii. Feeling he cannot cope without her for even a day, her boss Adrian Monk gets a seat on her flight to Hawaii, using Doxinyl (an OCD-control drug that also disables Monk's detecting skills, first seen in "Mr. Monk Takes His Medicine") to suppress his fear of flying.

Candace drives them to the Grand Kiahuna Poipu resort in Poipu. At the wedding, Monk's Doxinyl wears off and he exposes that Candace's fiancé Brian Galloway is already married, and has been planning to travel back and forth between his two families. Furious and mortified, Candace storms out. With the wedding canceled, Monk is eager to go home, but their booking is for a week, and Natalie plans to enjoy it.

Monk and Natalie stumble upon a police investigation at one of the resort's bungalows. The local Kauai police lieutenant, Ben Kealoha, tells them that elderly Helen Gruber was sitting in her hot tub when a coconut fell from a palm tree and struck her on the head, knocking her out, after which she drowned. Monk declares it to be murder, since the coconut has a soft spot from having rested on the ground. He says Gruber was killed in the bungalow, not the hot tub, since she is not wearing any suntan lotion. Lance Vaughan, Helen's husband who is thirty years her junior, was on a snorkeling trip at the time she was killed, and has video footage to prove it.

One of the hotel service employees mentions Helen was complaining about hearing voices at the bungalow. While at the beachside bar, Natalie is approached by Dylan Swift, a renowned TV psychic. Natalie's disbelief in communication with the dead is shaken when Swift reveals details about the death of her husband Mitch that were never made public. Swift says that Helen Gruber's spirit has communicated with him, and he needs to speak to Monk about it. Natalie refuses, so he tells her some cryptic images to pass on to Monk, including "love taking flight".

While renting a car, Monk and Natalie run into Brian, whose own rental has been vandalized. The car also has a stain on one seat. Kealoha baits Monk into helping out with some burglaries that took place in broad daylight, even in gated communities and security buildings. Monk asks Kealoha to join them for a game of golf at a local golf course the next morning.

At dinner, Natalie sees a woman who appears in the snorkeling video and has a tattoo of a heart with wings, which she interprets as "love taking flight". Monk and Natalie follow the woman to a condominium, where she meets up with Lance. The condo manager identifies her as Roxanne Shaw, who is from Cleveland, like Lance. Natalie tells Monk about Swift's information. Monk insists that Swift must have simply happened to see Lance and Roxanne together and persuades Natalie that his knowledge of Mitch was obtained through trickery.

During the golf game, Kealoha mentions that Helen is Lance's third wife. He marries elderly women and inherits their money when they die. The first two died of natural causes. Monk reveals that mailmen are the burglars, since only they could have pulled off such thefts, and all the recorded burglaries follow a mailman's schedule.

Monk notices Brian's rental car has been repaired, and the seats replaced. Hotel manager Martin Kamakele is upset that Monk asked the cleaning ladies to fold towels instead of roll them, making them fall behind schedule. He resolves the situation by moving Monk and Natalie to Helen Gruber's bungalow. Swift shows up to offer his psychic services in the murder investigation. At Monk's suggestion, Swift elaborates further on Mitch's death, revealing he ran to draw a Serbian patrol away from his injured crew. Monk ejects Swift from the bungalow and tells Natalie that Swift was lying. Natalie insists that she believes it is true even if Swift should be a fraud, and suggests Monk have Swift ask Trudy for clues to help solve her murder. Monk refuses.

Monk and Natalie's car is stolen. They get a new rental car from a different agency. Monk realizes some of the shelves in the bungalow's fridge had been put in upside down. He concludes that the killer stored Helen's body in the fridge to falsify the apparent time of death, rendering Lance's alibi invalid. Crime scene technicians find Helen's hair, blood, and footprints in the refrigerator, but there is still no evidence pointing to Lance as the murderer. However, Swift channels Helen, who directly accuses Lance. The police arrest Lance. Irate at being shown up, Monk fixes his eyes on proving Swift to be a fraud. Natalie pleads for Monk to leave Swift alone, and Monk reluctantly agrees.

The news of Swift's key role in resolving the case reaches national newspapers. Natalie tells Monk to do anything he can to ruin Swift. Monk and Natalie's car is t-boned by a pickup truck which flees the scene.

Monk and Natalie confront Swift. He has a blister on one hand, which he claims he got making breakfast. That night, Monk and Natalie participate in the hotel's luau. The event includes men digging up a roasted pig that has been placed in a six foot deep pit. The men instead dig up the cooked corpse of Martin Kamakele, who was beaten to death with a shovel. Upon returning to the bungalow, Monk tells Natalie Trudy had a security blanket which he buried with her.

The next morning, Monk sends a notarized letter. Kealoha calls to report that their first rental car has been found abandoned in a shopping mall parking lot. Monk recognizes the stained seats as coming from Brian's car. He gets Natalie to rent another newly arrived car. He cuts open the seats, revealing that they are packed with cocaine. Rental cars are being used to smuggle in drugs. The dealers use inside men at the rental agencies to tip them off to which cars have the drugs. They then send out men to wreck, vandalize, or steal the rental vehicles, knowing that seemingly random thefts and accidents involving rental vehicles are not likely to draw police attention. Once in the shop, they switch out the drug loaded seats for emptied seats from the last vehicle. Kealoha acknowledges that one body shop in the town of Kapaa gets most of the body shop work for rental cars.

Monk and Natalie fly back to San Francisco. Monk and Natalie head to the hotel where Swift is doing a show taping. During the show, Swift claims to be receiving a message from Trudy, and produces information about Trudy's security blanket. Monk shows the letter that he notarized in Hawaii, which claims that the story about Trudy's security blanket is fabricated. He did this to expose Swift as having killed Helen Gruber and Martin Kamakele. Monk reveals that Kamakele had the rooms of the Grand Kiahuna Poipu bugged to help Swift's show, since guests on the show typically stay at the hotel. The scheme worked until Helen complained about hearing voices. Swift knew Helen's hearing aids were picking up transmissions from the bugs in her room. Afraid that she would find out what was going on, he killed Helen while Lance was off snorkeling, then stashed her body in the fridge to mislead police into thinking someone was trying to falsify the time of death. Monk showing up at the hotel, enabling him to create publicity from solving the murder, was just a happy coincidence for Swift. Kamakele figured out what really happened to Helen and attempted to blackmail Swift. Swift beat Kamakele to death, and burned his hand while burying the body, explaining the blister.

Monk says that Swift's misreading of Trudy proves he cannot speak to the dead, so the only way he could have known details about Helen's murder is if he was the killer. He is convinced that the police will find recording equipment in Swift's bungalow and will test Helen's hearing aids to find they match the frequencies of the recording bugs. Swift is arrested.

Continuity

Other Monk novels
Monk also uses Doxinyl to combat his fear of flying in Mr. Monk Goes to Germany.
In the beginning of the novel, Natalie mentions the time that Monk moved in with her and Julie while his apartment was being fumigated in Mr. Monk Goes to the Firehouse.

Main series
The (fictional) anti-OCD drug, Doxinyl, was introduced in the season 3 episode "Mr. Monk Takes His Medicine," where it proved to have such a disastrous effect on Monk's abilities as a detective that he swore never to take it again. Hence, when Natalie calls Dr. Kroger from the Honolulu airport to say that Monk is on drugs, Dr. Kroger sounds surprised to find that he is taking Doxinyl again. Unlike in the episode, though, Monk is able to limit his intake of the pills, only taking them whenever flying is necessary.
Natalie mentions Mitch's death many times over the course of the novel, some elements of which she mentioned in the season 3 episode "Mr. Monk and the Election".
In the season 7 episode "Mr. Monk Is Underwater", Natalie reassures Monk to get on a submarine saying that it is like an island, and that he has already been to islands, comparing it to Hawaii.

Crossovers with other series
The character Lieutenant Ben Keoloha originates from the Diagnosis: Murder novel The Death Merchant, also written by Lee Goldberg.
In the start of the novel, Natalie mentions how all of the best detectives are nuts, using Nero Wolfe and Sherlock Holmes as examples, and explains that their assistants helped them to investigate (respectively Archie Goodwin and Dr. Watson).

List of characters

Characters from the television series
Adrian Monk: the titular detective
Natalie Teeger: Monk's loyal assistant and the narrator of the book
Captain Leland Stottlemeyer: Captain of the San Francisco Police Department's Homicide Division; Monk's oldest friend and former partner
Lieutenant Randy Disher: Stottlemeyer's right-hand man
Dr. Charles Kroger: Monk's psychiatrist
Peggy Davenport: Natalie's wealthy mother
Trudy Monk: Adrian's late wife who was killed by a car bomb
Mitch Teeger (mentioned only): Natalie's late husband who was shot down over Kosovo

Original characters

Candace: A close friend of Natalie's who lives in Los Angeles. She wants Natalie to be the maid of honor at her wedding.
Brian Galloway: Candace's would-be-husband. Monk discovers he is a bigamist.
Lieutenant Ben Keoloha: Kauai's police lieutenant.
Dylan Swift: Producer and host of the TV show Whispers from the Other Side. He is also a famous author.
Martin Kamakele: Manager of operations at the Belmont Hotel and the Grand Kiahuna Poipu
Helen Gruber: Murder victim from Cleveland.
Lance Vaughan: Helen's husband, who marries old ladies so that he and his girlfriend can live off of their money.
Roxanne Shaw: Lance Vaughan's girlfriend
Tetsuo Kapaka: An assistant manager at the Grand Kiahuna Poipu

References

2006 American novels
Monk (novel series)
Novels set in Hawaii
Signet Books books